Vale, North Carolina may refer to:
Vale, Avery County, North Carolina
Vale, Lincoln County, North Carolina